Yarikhan may refer to:
 Yarikhan-e Olya
 Yarikhan-e Sofla